Galicia is an autonomous community and historical nationality in modern-day northwestern Spain on the Iberian Peninsula, which was a major part of the Roman province known as Gallaecia prior to 409. It consists of the provinces of A Coruña, Lugo, Ourense and Pontevedra. It is bounded on the north by the Cantabrian Sea, to the south by Portugal, to the west by the Atlantic Ocean and to the east by principality of Asturias and the community of Castile and León. The archipelago of the Cíes Islands, the Ons archipelago, the Sálvora archipelago and other island such as Cortegada, Arousa, the Sisargas Islands and the Malveiras Islands are also part of Galicia.

Galicia has about 2,795,422 inhabitants which mainly combines the coastal strip between Ferrol and A Coruña in the northwest and between Vilagarcía de Arousa and Vigo in the southwest.

The medieval and modern Kingdom of Galicia derived of the kingdom of the Suebi, founded by king Hermeric in 409. By the 6th century the kingdom of the Suebi was already known as the Kingdom of Galicia, Gregory of Tours being the first chronicler to use this denomination.

Suebic Kings (409–585)

First Royal Dynasty (409–456)
Hermeric (409–438)
Rechila (438–448)
Rechiar (448–456)
Aioulf (456–457)

Kings during a Suebic Civil War (457–469)

Note: the civil war split the kingdom, and multiple kings ruled smaller regions of Galicia.
Maldras (457–460)
Framta (457)
Richimund (457–464)
Frumar (460–464)
Remismund (464–469) - reunification

Dark Period (469–550)
Hermeneric
Veremund
Theodemund

Final Suevic Period (550–585)
Chararic (550–558)
Ariamir (558–561)
Theodemar (561–570)
Miro or Mirón (570–583)
Eboric, or Euric (583–584)
Andeca (584–585)
Malaric (585)

Visigothic Kings (585-712)
The Visigoth kings took control of Galicia in 585, which became the sixth province of the Kingdom of Toledo. Galicia maintained a distinguishable administrative and legal identity up to the collapse of the Visigothic monarchy.

Liuvigild (585–586)
Reccared I (586–601)
Liuva II (601–603)
Witteric (603–610)
Gundemar (610–612)
Sisebut (612–621)
Reccared II (621)
Suintila (621–631)
Sisenand (631–636)
Chintila (636–640)
Tulga (640–641)
Chindasuinth (641–653)
Reccesuinth (649–672)
Wamba (672–680)
Erwig (680–687)
Egica, (687–702) - secured his son Wittiza as his heir
Wittiza (694-710) - associated to the throne as king in Galicia until 702; only king after his father's death
Roderic (710–712)

Asturian kings (740-910)
In 740, Alfonso I of Asturias captured Galicia from the Muslims.

Alfonso I of Asturias (740–757)
Fruela I of Asturias (757–768)
Aurelius of Asturias (768–774)
Silo of Asturias (774–783)
Mauregatus of Asturias (783–789)
Bermudo I of Asturias (788–791)
Alfonso II of Asturias (791–842)
Ramiro I of Asturias (842-850)
Ordoño I of Asturias (850–866)
Alfonso III of Asturias (866–910)

Kings of Galicia
In 910, Alfonso III the Great was forced to abdicate in favor of his sons, Ordoño, Fruela and Garcia, who partitioned the kingdom amongst them. Ordoño is the first to adopt the title "King of Galicia".

Ordoñez dynasty (910-1037)

Ordoño I (910–924). In 914, Ordoño succeeded Garcia on the thrones of León.
Fruela I (924-925). Brother of the former. Upon succeeding Ordoño on the thrones of León and Galicia he reunited his father's realm. 
Alfonso I (925). Son of the former. Briefly ruled as king before being ousted by his three cousins. 
Sancho I (925–929). First-born of Ordoño, cousin of the former.
Alfonso II (929-931). Brother of the former. 
Bermudo I (982–999). Crowned as anti-king by the Galician nobility in Santiago de Compostela. Routed Ramiro III of León in the battle of Portela de Areas, after which he acceded to the throne of Leon. 
Alfonso III (999-1028). Son of the former.
Bermudo II (1028-1037). Son of the former.

Jiménez dynasty (1037–1111)

Ferdinand I. (1037-1065). Upon his death, Castile, León and Galicia were divided amongst his sons.
García II (1065–1071) - reigned in Galicia and in the County of Portugal until he was deposed by his brothers Alfonso and Sancho in 1071, after which he was made prisoner until his death in 1090.
Sancho II (1071-1072) - briefly co-reigned as king of Galicia with his brother Alfonso until he was assassinated in 1072.
Alfonso IV (1071-1109) - co-ruled Galicia until his brother Sancho was assassinated in 1072, whereupon he succeeded in the throne of Castille also.
Urraca (1109-1111). Daughter of the former.

Burgundian dynasty (1111-1369)

Alfonso V (1111–1157). Son of the former. In 1111, he was crowned as the mediatized king of Galicia in Santiago de Compostela as his mother's heir apparent. In 1126 he succeeded Urraca as king of León, Castile and Toledo. During his reign, Afonso I of Portugal rebelled against León, which he was a vassal of. From 1152 on Alfonso VII associated his sons to the throne, Ferdinand receiving the title of King of Galicia. 
 Ferdinand II (1157–1188). Son of the former. Acceded to the throne of León upon his father's death in 1157.
 Alfonso VI (1188–1230). Son of the former. On his death, his kingdom was divided between his daughters, who reigned a few months de jure.
 Dulce and Sancha, queens of Galicia (1230) de jure
 Ferdinand III (1230–1252). King of Castile who became King of Galicia after Dulce and Sancha's renunciation of their titles.
 Alfonso VII (1252–1284). Son of the former.
 Sancho III (1284–1295). Son of the former.
 Ferdinand IV (1295–1312). During his early reign, his uncle John of Castile, Lord of Valencia de Campos disputed the title with him and claimed to be king of León, Galicia and Seville.
 Alfonso VIII (1312-1350). Son of the former.
 Peter of Castile (1350-1369). Son of the former.

Portuguese House of Burgundy (1369-1371)

 Ferdinand IV (1369-1371). Following Peter I of Castile's death, a succession crisis occurred. During this time, the throne of Galiza was offered to Ferdinand I of Portugal, a member of the Portuguese House of Burgundy, and he was acclaimed in Galicia as King. His reign would see the opening of trade between the two nations and economic benefits for both. This reign, however, would be short, as Ferdinand relinquished the throne of Galicia in favour of Henry II of Castile after the first of the Fernandine Wars.

House of Trastámara (1371-1555)

Henry I (1371-1379) - Son of Alfonso VII.
John I (1379–1390) - Son of the former. In 1386, John of Gaunt pressed the claim for his wife (and himself), to the throne of Castile. He successfully invaded Galicia and held most of the country until he was defeated in 1387.
Henry II (1390-1406) - Son of the former.
John II (1406-1454) - Son of the former.
Henry III (1454-1474) - Son of the former.
Isabella I (1474-1504) - Daughter of John II. Afonso V of Portugal and Juana la Beltraneja, acclaimed de jure kings of Galicia in 1475, saw their pretensions to the Castilian throne defeated at the Battle of Toro in 1479.
Joanna I (1504-1516/1555) - Daughter of the former. Confined and powerless.

House of Habsburg (1555-1700)

Charles I (1516/1555-1556). Son of Joanna.
Philip II of Spain (1556-1598). Son of the former.
Philip III of Spain (1598-1621). Son of the former.
Philip IV of Spain (1621-1665). Son of the former.
Charles II of Spain (1665-1700). Son of the former.

House of Bourbon (1700-1808)
Philip V of Spain (1700-1724). Great-grandson of Philip IV.
Louis I of Spain (1724). Son of the former.
Philip V of Spain (1724-1746). Great-grandson of Philip IV.
Ferdinand VI of Spain (1746-1749). Son of Philip V.
Charles III of Spain (1759-1788). Son of Philip V.
Charles IV of Spain (1788-1808). Son of the former.
Ferdinand VII of Spain (1808). Son of the former.

House of Bonaparte (1808-1813)
Joseph Bonaparte (1808-1813).

House of Bourbon (1813-1868)
Ferdinand VII of Spain (1813-1833)
Isabella II of Spain (1833-1868). Daughter of the former.

House of Savoy (1870-1873)
Amadeo I of Spain (1870-1873)

House of Bourbon (1874-1931)

Alfonso XII (1874-1885). Son of Isabella II.
Alfonso XIII (1886-1931). Son of the former.

House of Bourbon (1975-present)
Juan Carlos I of Spain (1975-2014). Grandson of Alfonso XIII.
Felipe VI (2014–present). Son of the former.

Gallery

See also

List of Portuguese monarchs
Monarchs' family tree
Monarchs of Spain
Monarchs' family tree
Kings of the Visigoths
Kings' family tree
Kings of Asturis
Monarchs' family tree
Monarchs of Navarre
Monarchs' family tree
Monarchs of Leon
Monarchs' family tree
Kings of Aragon
Monarchs' family tree
Kings of Castilla
Monarchs' family tree

References

Notes

Bibliography
 Carballeira Debasa, Ana María (2007). Galicia y los gallegos en las fuentes árabes medievales. Madrid: Consejo Superior de Investigaciones Cientifícas. . 
 De la Gándara, Felipe (1677): [https://books.google.com/books?id=Pi0_AAAAcAAJ Nobiliario, armas, y triunfos de Galicia"]. Julian de Paredes, Madrid. 
 Fletcher, Richard. A (1984): Saint James's catapult: the life and times of Diego Gelmírez of Santiago de Compostela. . 
 García Oro, José (1987): Galicia en los siglos XIV y XV. Fundación "Pedro Barrie de la Maza, Conde de Fenosa", A Coruña. . 
 González López, Emilio (1978): Grandeza e Decadencia do Reino de Galicia. Galaxia, Vigo. . 
 López Carreira, Anselmo (2005): O Reino medieval de Galicia. A Nosa Terra, Vigo.  
 Portela Silva, Ermelindo (2001): "García II de Galicia, el rey y el reino (1065-1090)". La Olmeda, Burgos. . 
 Rodríguez Fernández, Justianiano (1997): García I, Ordoño II, Fruela II, Alfonso IV. Editorial La Olmeda, Burgos. . 
 Thompson, E. A. (2002): Romans and barbarians: the decline of the Western Empire. Univ of Wisconsin Press. . 
 Torres Rodríguez, Casimiro (1977): El Reino de los Suevos. Fundación Barrié de la Maza, A Coruña. . 
 Villacañas Berlanga, José Luis (2006) La formación de los reinos hispánicos''. Pozuelo de Alarcón: Espasa Calpe. . 

 
Galician